The Willis River is a  tributary of the James River in central Virginia in the United States.  Via the James River, it is part of the watershed of Chesapeake Bay.

According to the Geographic Names Information System, the Willis River has also been known as "Willis's River" and as "Willises River".

Course
The Willis River rises in southern Buckingham County and initially flows eastwardly into Cumberland County, where it turns north-northeastwardly for the remainder of its course.

See also
List of Virginia rivers

References

DeLorme (2005).  Virginia Atlas & Gazetteer.  Yarmouth, Maine: DeLorme.  

Rivers of Virginia
Tributaries of the James River
Rivers of Buckingham County, Virginia
Rivers of Cumberland County, Virginia